Łazy  (formerly German Kolonie Loose) is a settlement in the administrative district of Gmina Dębno, within Myślibórz County, West Pomeranian Voivodeship, in north-western Poland.

For the history of the region, see History of Pomerania.

The settlement has a population of 33.

References

Villages in Myślibórz County